Star Cruises was a cruise line headquartered in Hong Kong and operating in the Asia-Pacific market. The company was owned by Genting Hong Kong. It was the eighteenth largest cruise line in the world after Carnival Corporation, Royal Caribbean Cruises and 15 others.

The chairman of Star Cruises was Tan Sri Lim Kok Thay, the son of the late Tan Sri Lim Goh Tong, the founder of Malaysia's Genting Highlands.

History

Star Cruises was founded as an associate of the Genting Group of Malaysia, incorporated in Bermuda on 10 November 1993 with its corporate headquarters in Hong Kong. The company's first ships were two cruiseferries acquired from the bankrupted estate of Swedish Rederi AB Slite. In the following years, the company purchased several other used ships. In 1998, Star Cruises took delivery of its first new build, SuperStar Leo, followed by sister ship SuperStar Virgo in 1999. Star Cruises also acquired Sun Cruises the same year.

In 2000, Star Cruises acquired Norwegian Cruise Line, including its subsidiaries Orient Lines and Norwegian Capricorn Line, becoming the largest global cruise line in the world. Norwegian Capricorn Line operations were soon merged into those of Star Cruises. Before the purchase of NCL, Star Cruises had several other new builds either planned or already under construction, but with the merger of the two companies, most of the constructed builds joined the NCL fleet instead of Star Cruises. In 2007, Star sold 50% of NCL to the Apollo Management group. In 2013, following a corporate reorganization and an initial public offering, NCL was made a wholly owned subsidiary of Norwegian Cruise Line Holdings. On 3 December 2018, Star and Apollo sold off their remaining stakes in Norwegian Cruise Line Holdings, marking the end of a relationship that lasted more than a decade.

In 2001, Star Cruises founded a new sister company, Cruise Ferries, which began operating its sole ship, Wasa Queen, on short cruises from Hong Kong to Xiamen followed by overnight gambling cruises from Hong Kong and gambling cruises from Port Klang in Kuala Lumpur. Wasa Queen ceased to function and was sold to another company in 2007.

In 2004, SuperStar Leo, was transferred to NCL. The ship became Norwegian Spirit and took over Norwegian Sky cruises. It was rushed into service under NCL America brand because the Pride of America wasn't ready on time due to sinking at Lloyd Werft shipyard. Since 2006, the trend has been for new ships to be built for NCL, and the old ships in the NCL fleet are transferred to the Star Cruises fleet in Asia.

In early 2008, both NCL America and Orient Lines brands were discontinued, with the latter's sole ship, MS Marco Polo, sold to Greek interests. Also in that year, the first ship from NCL was transferred to the Star Cruises fleet as SuperStar Libra.

Starting from 2011, Star Cruises received a new hullart. SuperStar Virgo, SuperStar Aquarius and Star Pisces have received their new hullart.

It was announced on 27 April 2012 that the Norwegian Dream will join the Star fleet, she will be named as SuperStar Gemini and will start service in 2012.

On 7 October 2013, Star Cruises announced that Star Cruises and their parent company, Genting Hong Kong, have entered into an agreement with Meyer Werft shipyard for the construction of one new cruise ship for Star. The vessel will have capacity for 3,364 passengers at double occupancy. The ship will be delivered sometime in Fall 2016.

Star Cruises announced on 10 February 2014, that a second ship was ordered and will be delivered by Fall 2017. Both ships will 150,000 GT. On 9 February 2015, the first steel cutting ceremony for Genting World was held at Meyer Werft shipyard.

In November 2015, it was announced that the vessels under construction would instead be delivered to Dream Cruises, with a new class of ships planned to be designed for Star Cruises.

The company announced in March 2018 that one of its ships, SuperStar Libra, would end her public cruise operations for the company on 27 June 2018.

On 8 March 2018, Genting Hong Kong announced that the first Global-class newbuild that was previously allocated to Star Cruises would join the Dream Cruises fleet.

On 11 September 2018, Genting Hong Kong announced that SuperStar Virgo would move to Dream Cruises in April 2019 and be renamed the Explorer Dream. In November 2018, SuperStar Gemini returned to Malaysia for a six-month deployment.

In January 2022, the parent company of Star Cruises, Genting Hong Kong, declared bankruptcy due to the effects of the COVID-19 pandemic.

In April 2022, following the collapse of the parent company of Star Cruises, Genting Hong Kong; SuperStar Gemini, SuperStar Aquarius & Star Pisces were all sold for scrap.

Their smaller sister ship, The Taipan, was sold to OM Ships International in May 2022 and renamed Doulos Hope. Operation Mobilisation affiliate Gute Bücher für Alle accepted the ship in Penang, Malaysia on 25 May and completed her sea trial on July 20. She then sailed to Singapore to continue a refurbishment which should conclude before the end of 2023.

The Star Cruises Trademarks were sold to Genting Group Chairman and CEO Lim Kok Thay.

Former Fleet
Ships that sailed as part of Star Cruises:

Cancelled ships 
Ships that were ordered for Star Cruises but transferred before completion or never built:

References

External links

 

Companies listed on the Hong Kong Stock Exchange
Companies listed on the Singapore Exchange
1993 establishments in Hong Kong
2022 disestablishments in Hong Kong
Cruise lines
 
Transport companies established in 1993
Transport companies disestablished in 2022
Malaysian brands